Swatch of No Ground Marine Protected Area is a protected area in the Bay of Bengal. The reserve covers an area of 163,600 hectares (429,000 acres).

It was established on 26 October 2014, making it the first Marine Protected Area (MPA) in the country. The area hosts important habitats for several endangered creatures such as various species of dolphins and whales.

Geography 
The Swatch of No Ground (SoNG) is a 14 km deep trench in the Bay of Bengal. It is located 30 km from Dublar Char Islands, located in the Sundarbans. This deepest trench has a record size of about 1340 meters. It has an average depth of about 1,200 meters underwater. This underwater trench is a part of the Bengal Fan, the largest underwater ravine in the world.

A deep ditch-like place in the Bay of Bengal, west of the Ganges-Brahmaputra delta, is known as Ganga Fan or Bengal Fan.

Biodiversity 
The area has notable biodiversity of oceanic fauna such as cetaceans, sea turtles, fish, and sea birds. Among these, local populations of cetaceans have been the primal focus of past studies; core species include Bryde's whales, Spinner dolphins, Indo-Pacific bottlenose dolphins, Indo-Pacific humpback dolphins, Pantropical spotted dolphins, Irrawaddy dolphins, Indo-Pacific finless porpoises, and species with less-frequency include Minke whales, Rough-toothed dolphins and False killer whales. Some of these species are genetically unique and endangered.

There are a number of other notable wildlife in the area, such as Whale sharks, Hammerhead sharks, Tunas, Groupers, Hawksbill turtles, Olive ridley turtles, Masked boobies, Great black-backed gulls, Crested terns, swimming crabs, and so on.

History 
In the past, the fishermen, who lived nearby from this area, did not get any measurement by their native bamboo measurement system "Bam", and named it "Na Bam" (No Bam or, Bamless). It is one of the 11 largest valleys in the world. It is said that here in 1863, a 212 tonne gunboat named Gadfly, sank in a storm while carrying huge amount of treasure from India to United Kingdom.

See also 
Sundarbans National Park
Nijhum Dwip National Park and St. Martin's Island - MPAs with marine mammal diversity, declared after the Swatch of No Ground MPA
List of protected areas of Bangladesh

References 

Protected areas of Bangladesh
Bay of Bengal